Andrea Absolonová (26 December 1976 – 9 December 2004), better known by the pseudonym Lea De Mae, was a Czech diver and a member of the Czech high diving national team, later an adult model and pornographic actress. She died from brain cancer on 9 December 2004, at the age of 27.

Biography
Born in Czechoslovakia, Absolonová became a member of the Czech high diving national team, along with her sister Lucie. She injured her spine in an accident when training for the 1996 Summer Olympics in Atlanta, diving from the 10m platform. She recovered from her injury, but did not qualify for the 2000 Sydney Olympics. Her problems persisted, so she retired from professional sports.

Absolonová was later persuaded by a photographer to pose nude and eventually to participate in the adult film industry.

As Lea De Mae, she appeared in over 80 adult films. She first appeared on American screens in a series of features for Private Media Group. She eventually returned to Europe, shooting more films, but after a short time returned to the United States.

De Mae was diagnosed with glioblastoma, an aggressive form of brain cancer in July 2004. Fans and fellow porn actors contributed to a medical fund set up for her in Prague, but she died on 9 December 2004 at the age of 27.

Her Body is an upcoming Czech-Slovak film by documentary filmmaker Natália Císařovská. It is her debut feature film. The film will be about Andrea Absolonová. The film was supported by the State Cinematography Fund and the SK Audiovisual Fund.

References

External links
 

1976 births
2004 deaths
Deaths from brain cancer in the Czech Republic
Deaths from glioblastoma
Czech female divers
Czech pornographic film actresses